South Cobb High School is a public high school located on Clay Road, in Austell, Georgia, United States. Founded in 1952, it is part of the Cobb County School District. Clint Terza succeeded Ashley Hosey as principal in 2016. Nominated as a National School of Excellence, South Cobb High School participates in the Cobb County magnet program. The school houses the county's program for medical sciences.

Notable alumni

 Nick Ayers, political analyst 
 Roy Barnes, former Georgia governor; graduated from South Cobb in 1966
 Andrés Cabrero, professional soccer player
 Robby Hammock, former professional baseball player (Arizona Diamondbacks); current manager of the Mobile BayBears
 Garrison Johnson, professional basketball player
 Kenny McKinley, Denver Broncos receiver
 Ray Stevens, country singer/songwriter
 Billy Wilkins, developer of the Wesley Sleep Program and original member of band Third Day
 Jimmy Wang Yang, professional wrestler
 Justin Jones, Los Angeles Chargers defensive tackle
 Jerry Jacobs, Detroit Lions cornerback

References 

Schools in Cobb County, Georgia
Public high schools in Georgia (U.S. state)
Educational institutions established in 1952
1952 establishments in Georgia (U.S. state)